KXLY (920 kHz) is a commercial AM radio station in Spokane, Washington. It broadcasts a news/talk radio format with the branding "920 News Now". The station is owned by QueenB Radio, with its license held by Morgan Murphy Media.

Studios and offices are on West Boone Avenue in Spokane. KXLY uses a non-directional antenna, from a transmitter site off South Regal Street in Spokane. By day it operates with a power of 20,000 watts, which is reduced to 5,000 watts at night in order to protect other stations on 920 AM from interference.

Programming is also carried on 250 watt FM translator K264CH at 100.7 MHz.

Programming
Weekdays on KXLY begin with a four-hour block of news and information, 920 News Now with Dave Spencer.  The rest of the weekday schedule is made up of nationally syndicated shows:  Dan Bongino, The Ramsey Show, Ben Shapiro, Lars Larson, Mark Levin, Markey, Van Camp & Robbins and Bloomberg Radio.  Weekends feature shows on money, health, home improvement, technology, the outdoors and wine.

KXLY is the flagship station of The Cougar Sports Radio Network, which carries Washington State Cougars football and men's basketball games. It is also the alternate affiliate of the Seattle Mariners Radio Network baseball. KXLY 920 has a news sharing arrangement with co-owned KXLY-TV Channel 4 and also carries ABC News Radio world and national news.

History

From 1912 to 1927 radio communication in the United States was regulated by the Department of Commerce, and originally there were no formal requirements for stations, most of which operated under Amateur and Experimental licenses, making broadcasts intended for the general public. In order to provide a common standard, the department issued a regulation effective December 1, 1921 requiring that broadcasting stations would now have to hold a Limited Commercial license that authorized operation on two designated broadcasting wavelengths: 360 meters (833 kHz) for "entertainment", and 485 meters (619 kHz) for "market and weather reports".

The first two Spokane broadcasting station authorizations were issued to the Doerr-Mitchell Electric Company on March 23, 1922 for KFZ, and to the Spokane Chronicle on April 12, 1922 for KOE, both for operation on 360 meters. Because there was only the single entertainment wavelength, stations in a given region had to develop timesharing arrangements for broadcasts on the shared 360 meter wavelength.

KFDC
In 1922, 17-year-old  Edmund B. Craney was an employee at the Radio Supply Company in Spokane, which was owned by Thomas W. Symons, Jr. Craney was a member of the North Central High School radio club. In the summer of 1921 physics teacher Arthur L. Smith had arranged for the school to be issued a "Technical and Training School" station license, with the call sign 7YL. In addition, Craney held a license for amateur station 7AEG.

Craney convinced his employer that the Radio Supply Company should operate a broadcasting station, in order to promote sales. The December 1, 1921 regulations that had established the broadcasting service required that station operators had to hold a "commercial second-class license or higher", and Craney arranged to take the training for the needed qualification. On November 21, 1922 a broadcasting station license with the call sign KFDC was issued in the name of "Radio Supply Co. (E. B. Craney)", for operation on 360 meters, although Craney later reported that broadcasts originating from Radio Supply had started on October 18, 1922. The KFDC call letters were randomly assigned from an alphabetical roster of available call signs. The station's history makes it the oldest surviving Spokane radio station. (KHQ, now KQNT, was first licensed earlier, on February 28, 1922, but didn't move to Spokane until 1925. KFIO now KSBN, first licensed on May 22, 1923, has a slightly longer continuous history, because unlike KXLY it was never deleted and relicensed.) 

Although initially licensed to broadcast on 360 meters, Craney later reported that technical issues meant that the station had difficulty maintaining its assigned wavelength. In mid-1923 KFDC was reassigned to 1060 kHz.

Deletion and revival as KFPY
KFDC suspended operations and was deleted on September 19, 1923. However, the station was revived the next year, and was relicensed on April 23, 1924 to the Symons Investment Company, again on 1060 kHz, with the sequentially assigned call letters of KFPY. KFPY was housed in the Symons Building on 7 South Howard Street in Spokane. Beginning in 1925, audience members were welcomed to view live broadcasts—usually music programs or dramas—at "The Golden Concert Studios of KFPY" on the second floor, which boasted a curtain, a stage and seating for 150. On the stage were two grand pianos and a Wurlitzer Organ. It was through these facilities that Bing Crosby, then an unknown Gonzaga University student, made his radio debut. Decades later, Crosby would partner with the station to launch KXLY-TV.  Other future stars who performed at the Golden Studios include Bob Crosby and Patrice Munsel.

KFPY was reported to be transmitting on 1100 kHz as of December 31, 1926, and in mid-1927 this was changed to 1220 kHz. On November 11, 1928, under the provisions of the Federal Radio Commission's General Order 40, KFPY was assigned to 1390 kHz on a timesharing basis with KWSC in Pullman, which was changed to unlimited hours on 1340 kHz in August 1929. In 1935 the station moved to 890 kHz.

KFPY was Spokane's CBS Radio Network affiliate from 1929 until the 1990s. During the Golden Age of Radio, the station carried CBS's dramas, comedies, news, sports, soap operas, game shows and big band broadcasts. In March 1941, stations on 890 kHz were moved to KXLY's current frequency of 920 kHz, as part of the implementation of the North American Regional Broadcasting Agreement.

KXLY
Craney left KFPY in 1927 to found KGIR in Butte, Montana. He returned to Spokane in 1945 to buy KFPY, which was renamed to KXLY on December 19, 1946. The new call letters reflected Craney's "XL Network," a chain of stations he also owned in Butte, Helena, Bozeman, Great Falls and Missoula, all of which had call letters beginning with "KXL".

On February 22, 1953, the radio station expanded into television with the signon of KXLY-TV on channel 4; like its radio cousin, the TV station was an affiliate of the CBS network, but has been with ABC since 1976. That same year in November, Craney sold KXLY and KXLY-TV to the Northern Pacific Radio and Television Corporation, headed by Joseph Harris, Norman Eisenstein, and Richard E. Jones. Northern Pacific sold the KXLY stations (which now included KXLY-FM) in 1961 to the current owners, Morgan Murphy Media.

In September 1998, the CBS Radio network affiliation moved to 1510 KGA. KXLY picked up ABC News Radio, matching its television counterpart's affiliation, which had made the switch 22 years earlier in 1976 after CBS ended its affiliation with the TV station.

On September 17, 2015, KXLY added an FM translator on 100.3 MHz. In April 2016, the translator moved to 100.7 FM.

References

External links
KXLY website

FCC History Cards for KXLY (covering 1927-1980)

Morgan Murphy Media stations
XLY
News and talk radio stations in the United States
XLY
Radio stations established in 1922
1922 establishments in Washington (state)
Washington State Cougars football
Washington State Cougars men's basketball